Peter Carl Ordeshook (born May 21, 1942) is an American political scientist. He is the Mary Stillman Harkness Professor of Political Science at the California Institute of Technology in Pasadena, California.

He held faculty positions at Carnegie Mellon University (1968–1982) and the University of Texas at Austin (1982–1987), where he served as the Frank C. Erwin Jr. Centennial Chair in Government. He was a fellow at the Center for Advanced Study in the Behavioral Sciences at Stanford University from 1975 to 1976, and he was the president of the Public Choice Society from 1986 to 1988. He has been a professor at Caltech since 1987. He has authored influential papers and books, such as "The Calculus of Voting" (co-authored with William H. Riker).  He is a Fellow of the American Academy of Arts and Sciences.

Early life and education 
Peter Ordeshook was born in Chelsea, Massachusetts, May 21, 1942, the son of Mary Romanowicz and Peter Ordeshook whose parents had emigrated from Poland and Ukraine respectively in 1907. His Ukrainian side of the family came from Kamin-Kashyrskyi of Volyn area in Ukraine. He attended Chelsea High School. 

Odershook graduated from the Massachusetts Institute of Technology in 1964 with a Bachelor of Science degree in economics, politics, and engineering. He enrolled for graduate studies at the University of Rochester and received his Ph.D. in Political Science in 1969.

Academic Career 
Ordeshook's academic career spans a broad spectrum in political science, covering areas as diverse as the election process, international relations, and applications of game theory to politics.

Formal Theory in Political Science 
Ordeshook was one of the pioneers who introduced formal mathematical models into political science, and has been highly influential in the field.

Experimental and Empirical Political Science 
Richard McKelvey and Peter Ordeshook were early developers of laboratory experiments that showed how people can use relatively simple pieces of information to make complex political decisions. Specifically, they examined when uninformed voters can use cues from polls and endorsements to cast the same votes they would have cast if they were more informed. One experiment focused on whether these cues could lead otherwise uninformed voters to have a thought like “if that many voters are voting for the [rightist candidate], he can’t be too liberal” and use that fact to figure out how they would vote if they knew more about the issues (McKelvey and Ordeshook 1985). Political economist Thomas Palfrey describes their main finding as follows:

“Perhaps the most striking experiment… only a few of the voters in the experiments knew where the candidates located... they proved that this information alone is sufficient to reveal enough to voters that even uninformed voters behave optimally – i.e., as if they were fully informed.”

McKelvey and Ordeshook’s experiments showed an unexpected range of conditions under which (a) uninformed voters vote competently and (b) election outcomes are identical to what they would have been if all voters were sufficiently informed. These findings prompted a reconsideration of how voters use information to make decisions.

In empirical work, Ordeshook and Zeng (1997) tested hypotheses generated from rational voter models, in particular the expected utility models of voting (Downs 1957, Riker and Ordeshook 1968), in the context of three-candidate presidential elections. These models assume that turnout and candidate choice decisions are influenced by, among other factors, the voter's consideration of the potential benefit of the decision weighted by the probability that the benefit would be realized. Ordeshook and Zeng found empirical evidence that expected utility calculations add little to our understanding of the decision to vote, but such strategic considerations significantly influence candidate choice decisions, especially among voters who favor a minor party candidate.

Constitution Design 
In the 1990s and early 2000s, Ordeshook collaborated with his students and social scientists from Russia and Ukraine, and helped each of these countries design their new constitution. He studied the role of constitutional secessions clauses (Chen and Ordeshook,1994), how to design a federalist system (Filippov, Ordeshook and Shvetsova, 2004), and the forensics of election fraud in Russia and Ukraine (Myagkov and Ordeshook, 2009).

In 1996-1998 Ordeshook was invited to teach Political Science and Game Theory at The International Summer School in Political Science and International Relations, funded by the Stefan Batory Foundation. At the time the Summer School was focused on sponsoring the students from the former Soviet Union and other Soviet bloc countries so that they would engage in intensive study of the subjects previously not available under Soviet regime thus allowing the new generation of potential scholars to be exposed to the Western thought and democracy. 

After engaging in the study of budding Russian federalism (with Olga Shvetsova, Misha Myagkov, and Mikhail G. Filippov) and sharing his expertise on the subject with Russian lawmakers, Peter Ordeshook turned to studying another post-Soviet state, namely Ukraine.  His work and collaboration with prominent Ukrainian Sociologist, Valeriy Khmelko and Melvin J. Hinich resulted in publications in Post-Soviet Affairs (1999, 2002), where they analyze the results of Ukraine's 1998 parliamentary and 1999 presidential elections using spatial model of voting, specifically concentrating on East/West divide of Ukraine.

Teaching and Mentoring 
Ordeshook has been an outstanding mentor and adviser to graduate students. His notable students and mentees include Emerson Niou, Kenneth Williams, Guofu Tan, Arthur Lupia, Langche Zeng, Yan Chen, Katerina Sherstyuk and Olga Shvetsova and Marianna Klochko. He was the Director of Graduate Studies in the early to mid 1990s at Caltech Division of Humanities and Social Sciences, putting a significant effort in finding and attracting promising graduate students to the program, and further pioneering recruitment of students from China and the former USSR. Aligned with Ordeshook’s research interest in voting, corruption and constitutional design, collaborations with many of these students resulted in research contributions such as  Constitutional Secessions Clauses (with Yan Chen, Constitutional Political Economy,1994), Designing Federalism (with M. Filippov and O. Shvetsova, Cambridge University Press, 2004), Endogenous Time Preferences in Social Networks (with Marianna Klochko, Edward Elgar, 2005),  and The Forensics of Election Fraud: Russia and Ukraine (with Mikhail Myagkov, Cambridge University Press, 2009).

Selected publications 
 McKelvey, Richard D., and Peter C. Ordeshook. 1985. “Elections with Limited Information: A Fulfilled Expectations Model Using Contemporaneous Poll and Endorsement Data as Information Sources.” Journal of Economic Theory 36: 55-85.
 Ordeshook, Peter C. and Langche Zeng. 1997. "Rational Voters and Strategic Voting: Evidence from the 1968, 1980 and 1992 Elections", Journal of Theoretical Politics, 9(2): 167–187.
 Lessons for Citizens of a New Democracy. Edward Elgar, 1997.
 A Political Theory Primer. Routledge Press, 1992.
 Constitutional Secessions Clauses (with Yan Chen), Constitutional Political Economy. 1994.
 The Forensics of Election Fraud: Russia and Ukraine (with Mikhail Myagkov), Cambridge University Press, 2009.
 Endogenous Time Preferences in Social Networks (with Marianna Klochko), Edward Elgar, 2005.
 Designing Federalism (with M. Filippov and O. Shvetsova), Cambridge University Press, 2004.
 Game Theory and Political Theory, Cambridge University Press, 1986.
 The Balance of Power: Stability in International Systems (with Emerson Niou and Gregory Rose), Cambridge University Press, 1989.

References

External links 
 Ordeshook's profile
 Google scholar page
 https://www.amacad.org/directory?search_api_fulltext=Ordeshook&field_class_section=21&field_class_section_1=All&field_deceased=All&sort_bef_combine=search_api_relevance_DESC&sort_by=field_election_year&sort_order=DESC

1942 births
Living people
Massachusetts Institute of Technology alumni
University of Rochester alumni
California Institute of Technology faculty
Carnegie Mellon University faculty